Parnaoz (Parnaoz Irakliyevich Gruzinsky) (14 February 1777 – 30 March 1852) was a Georgian prince (batonishvili) of the Bagrationi dynasty, the 14th son of Heraclius II, the penultimate king of Kartli and Kakheti, by his third marriage to Queen Darejan Dadiani. Parnaoz tried to challenge the recently established Imperial Russian rule in Georgia and in 1804 headed an unsuccessful insurrection of the Georgian mountaineers in the course of which he was arrested and deported to Russia. Afterwards, he spent most of his life in St. Petersburg, becoming the first Georgian translator of the 18th-century French philosopher Jean-Jacques Rousseau.

Involvement in civil unrest
Parnaoz's active involvement in the politics of his country came with the accession of his half-brother, George XII, to the throne of Kartli and Kakheti after the death of Heraclius II in 1798. George reversed the rule of succession approved in 1791 by Heraclius under the influence of Queen Darejan, requiring the king's successor to pass the throne not to his offspring, but to his eldest brother. This would have made Parnaoz the 6th in the line of succession, behind George and his elder brothers, Iulon, Vakhtang, Mirian, and Alexander. Instead, the new monarch, having renewed quest for Russian protection, obtained from Paul I of Russia recognition of his son, David, as heir-apparent on 18 April 1799. This gave rise to a dynastic dispute, in which Parnaoz stood by Iulon's side.

By July 1800, the crisis had taken on the characteristics of a military conflict. Parnaoz joined his brothers, Iulon and Vakhtang, in blocking the roads to the capital city of Tbilisi in an attempt to rescue their mother, Queen Dowager Darejan, who had been forced by George XII into confinement at her own palace in Avlabari. Parnaoz threatened Gori and the king ordered Prince Otar Amilakhvari to defend the town at all cost. The arrival of additional Russian troops under Major-General Vasily Gulyakov in September 1800 in Tbilisi made George XII's position relatively secure and the rebellious princes withdrew to the provinces. Parnaoz took control of the important fortress of Surami and began to fortify it, while another of his brothers, the bellicose Prince Alexander, fled to Dagestan to rally the Avars for his cause.

Anti-Russian rebel
After the death of George XII in December 1800 the Russians prevented his heir David from acceding to the throne and went ahead with the outright annexation of Georgia to the Russian Empire. The Russian commander in Georgia, General Ivan Lazarev, requested that all the members of the royal house should assemble and remain in Tbilisi. In April 1801 Iulon and Parnaoz defied the order and fled to western Georgia, to the court of their sisterly nephew, King Solomon II of Imereti, who had upheld Iulon's claim to the throne of Kartli and Kakheti.

After a series of attempts to induce the Georgians to rise against the Russian rule, Iulon and Parnaoz eventually crossed, in June 1804, into Kartli, where the Georgian and Ossetian peasants had revolted. The princes failed to make their way to join the rebels and fell back to Imereti. A Russian detachment, commanded by Captain Novitsky and guided by the loyal Georgian prince Giorgi Amirejibi, hurried from Tskhinvali and surprised Iulon's sleeping men at the Imeretian border. In a brief skirmish on 24 June 1804, Iulon was captured, barely escaping death, and sent in custody to Tbilisi. Parnaoz fled to the Iranian-controlled territory, but soon returned to reignite the revolt among the Georgian highlanders and the Ossetians, living on both sides of the Greater Caucasus crest.

Initial successes of the rebels were reversed by the resolute action of Major General Pyotr Nesvetayev in September 1804. Nesvetayev foiled Parnaoz's attempt to prevent the fall of Stepantsminda to the Russians, defeated his forces at Sioni, and, pursuing the retreating prince down to the Terek valley, quickly seized his main base at Ananuri. Parnaoz, with his 30 followers, including the young prince Alexander Chavchavadze, the future poet and general of the Russian army, attempted to fight his way to Erivan, but was apprehended in October 1804, while fording the Kura at Demurchasaly, some 43 km south of Tbilisi, by a Russian "flying detachment" commanded by his wife's relative, Brigadier Prince Tamaz Orbeliani.

Life in Russia
Prince Pavel Tsitsianov, the Russian commander in Georgia, captured Parnaoz and Iulon on 4 April 1805; he had Parnaoz deported to Voronezh and Iulon sent to Tula. Accompanied by his wife and four daughters, Parnaoz later obtained a permission to move to St. Petersburg, where he settled permanently. During his exile in Voronezh, he went blind translating into Georgian the works of Jean-Jacques Rousseau. Parnaoz was also a poet of some talent. His best known writings, particularly, his poem "All of you, remember bygone times" (იგონეთ ყოველთა დრონი წინარე), were imbued with the language of lament for his lost kingdom. He died in 1852, having outlived his wife and four of his six children. He was buried at the Church of St. Theodore, the Alexander Nevsky Lavra.

Family

Prince Parnaoz married in 1795 Anna (1777 – 25 May 1850), daughter of Prince George, the last Duke of Ksani. She was the Dame of the Lesser Cross of the Order of St. Catherine (1841), died at St. Petersburg, and was buried at the Alexander Nevsky Lavra. The couple had one son and five daughters:
 Prince David. He died in infancy.
 Princess Salome (1797 – 20 August 1860), Maid of Honor to the Empress of Russia. She died unmarried at St. Petersburg.
 Princess Sophio (1798 – ?). She died very young.
 Princess Elene (1799 – 7 July 1867), Maid of Honor to the Empress of Russia. She died unmarried at Tsarskoye Selo.
 Princess Elisabed (4 October 1800 – 21 December 1819). She died unmarried at St. Petersburg and was buried at the Alexander Nevsky Lavra.
 Princess Nino (28 September 1802 – 1 September 1828), Dame of the Lesser Cross of the Order of St. Catherine (1833). She married in 1822, as his first wife, Colonel Prince Alexander Dadiani (1800 – 1865) and had one son, Nikolay (1824 – 1829). She is buried at the Alexander Nevsky Lavra.

Ancestry

Notes

References

 
 
 
 
 
 
 

1777 births
1852 deaths
Bagrationi dynasty of the Kingdom of Kartli-Kakheti
Georgian princes
Rebels from Georgia (country)
Male poets from Georgia (country)
Translators from French
18th-century people from Georgia (country)
19th-century people from Georgia (country)